Fung-wong may refer to four tropical cyclones in the Pacific Ocean. The name, contributed by Hong Kong, refers to Lantau Peak (Phoenix Mountain), the highest point in Hong Kong's Lantau Island. The name is also the Cantonese pronunciation and romanization of the word for the Chinese phoenix (鳳凰, fènghuáng).

 Typhoon Fung-wong (2002) (T0211, 15W, Kaka)
 Typhoon Fung-wong (2008) (T0808, 09W, Igme) – struck Taiwan and China
 Tropical Storm Fung-wong (2014) (T1416, 16W, Mario) – struck Philippines
 Severe Tropical Storm Fung-wong (2019) (T1927, 28W, Sarah)

Pacific typhoon set index articles